is a Japanese retired professional boxer who fought in the super flyweight division. He is a former WBC and lineal super flyweight champion.

Biography 
Kawashima joined the boxing gym of former WBC and WBA minimumweight champion Hideyuki Ohashi in 1995, and made his professional debut on February 20, 1997, with a 2nd round knockout victory. He lost a 6-round decision in only his 6th professional fight, but steadily compiled wins to challenge Jesse Maca for the OPBF super flyweight title on December 11, 2000. The bout resulted in a 12-round unanimous decision loss for Kawashima.

Kawashima first entered the WBC rankings in 2001 with a 10-round decision victory over former WBA super flyweight champion Yokthai Sithoar. He challenged the Japanese super flyweight title the following year, and won his first title by split decision over 10 rounds. He defended the title once before returning it.

On June 23, 2003, Kawashima got his first shot at a world title against WBC and lineal super flyweight champion Masamori Tokuyama, but lost by unanimous decision over 12 rounds. He challenged Tokuyama for the second time a year later on June 28, 2004, and scored a surprising 1st round knockout only 1 minute and 47 seconds into the bout to win the super flyweight crown. Tokuyama had defended the title 9 times before this loss.

Kawashima scored three knockdowns en route to a unanimous decision victory in his first world title defense on September 20, 2004. On January 3, 2005, he fought undefeated Jose Navarro for his second defense, and won a controversial split decision to retain his title. One judge had scored 11 of 12 rounds in favor of Navarro, while the other two scored it closely in favor of Kawashima, who was cut over both eyes for most of the fight.

Kawashima met Masamori Tokuyama for the third time on July 18, 2005, for his third defense of the world title. Kawashima managed to knockdown Tokuyama in the 12th round, but was unable to mount a consistent offense for the rest of the fight as Tokuyama regained his title by unanimous decision.

On September 18, 2006, Kawashima fought Cristian Mijares for the WBC super flyweight interim title. He managed to knock down his opponent in the 2nd round, but lost a close split decision where two judges scored the fight for Mijares by only one point (114-113), and the other judge scored the fight for Kawashima also by one point. He announced his retirement shortly afterwards, but retracted it on October 19, 2006, when a rematch was organized against Mijares, who had recently been promoted to the regular champion after the retirement of Masamori Tokuyama. The rematch was held on January 3, 2007, and Kawashima lost by technical knockout in the tenth round after suffering a knockdown which was regarded as a slip by the referee. This was the first time Kawashima had been knocked out in his entire career.

Kawashima announced his retirement for the second time after the second loss to Mijares, but returned to the ring with a 3rd round knockout win on June 4, 2007. He challenged WBA super flyweight champion Alexander Muñoz as the 7th ranked contender to the title on January 14, 2008, but lost a unanimous decision where he was almost knocked out in the 11th round. He announced his retirement for the third time after the fight. His professional record was 32-7-0 (21KOs).

Professional boxing record

See also 
List of super flyweight boxing champions
List of WBC world champions
List of Japanese boxing world champions
Boxing in Japan

References

External links 

Katsushige Kawashima - CBZ Profile

|-

|-

1974 births
Living people
People from Ichihara, Chiba
Sportspeople from Chiba Prefecture
Super-flyweight boxers
World Boxing Council champions
Japanese male boxers